Like a Hurricane may refer to:
 "Like a Hurricane" (Neil Young song), 1975
 Like a Hurricane (album), a 1987 album by C. C. Catch